Martin Hans Christian Knudsen (February 15, 1871 in Hasmark on Funen – May 27, 1949 in Copenhagen) was a Danish physicist who taught and conducted research at the Technical University of Denmark.

He is primarily known for his study of molecular gas flow and the development of the Knudsen cell, which is a primary component of molecular beam epitaxy systems.

Knudsen received the University's gold medal in 1895 and earned his master's degree in physics the following year.  He became lecturer in physics at the University in 1901 and professor in 1912, when Christian Christiansen (1843–1917) retired.  He held this post until his own retirement in 1941.

Knudsen was renowned for his work on kinetic-molecular theory and low-pressure phenomena in gases.  His name is associated with the Knudsen flow, Knudsen diffusion, Knudsen number, Knudsen layer and Knudsen gases.  Also there is the Knudsen equation; two instruments, the Knudsen absolute manometer and Knudsen gauge; and one gas pump that operates without moving parts, the Knudsen pump. His book, The Kinetic Theory of Gases (London, 1934), contains the main results of his research.

Knudsen was also very active in physical oceanography, developing methods of defining properties of seawater.  He participated as hydrographer on the Ingolf expedition in the North Atlantic in 1895-96. By means of his for the purpose constructed precision thermometer, capable of measuring water temperature in the deep sea with a precision of 1/100°C, it was demonstrated that the water masses at the sea floor north of the Wyville Thompson Ridge were consistently a few degrees colder than south of the ridge and likely explained the differences in the deep sea fauna on either sides of the ridge. He was editor of Hydrological Tables (Copenhagen–London, 1901). In 1927, he was one of the participants of the fifth Solvay Conference on Physics that took place at the International Solvay Institute for Physics in Belgium.

He was awarded the Alexander Agassiz Medal of the U.S. National Academy of Sciences in 1936. He was made a Commander First Class of the Order of the Dannebrog.

References

Literature
 Matematiken i Danmark (Mathematics in Denmark) by Niels Nielsen, Gyldendalske Boghandel, Nordisk Forlag, København. Vol. I: 1801-1908, published 1910; Vol. II: 1528-1800, published 1912. (In Danish). Note: This important work is a compilation of Danish mathematical writings. In addition to mathematicians, the short biographical notes include many physicists, astronomers, and early natural philosophers, including medical practitioners.
 Kemien i Danmark (Chemistry in Denmark) by Stig E. Veibel.  Vol. I: Kemiens historie i Danmark (The History of Chemistry in Denmark), 1939.  Vol. II: Dansk Kemisk Bibliografi, 1800-1935 (Danish Chemistry Bibliography), 1943.  Vol III: Danske Kemikere (Danish Chemists), edited by Bodil Jerslev, 1968 (Three of six chapters by Stig Veibel).  All published by Nyt Nordisk Forlag, Copenhagen. (In Danish).  Note: Vol. II is a compilation of Danish publications in chemistry and includes works by physicists, geologists, biologists, and physicians, along with biographical information.
 Dictionary of Scientific Biography, Charles Coulston Gillispie, editor, Scribner's & Sons, New York, 1980 (16 Volumes).  Supplement of 1990 (Volumes 17 and 18).

1871 births
1949 deaths
Danish physicists
Members of the Prussian Academy of Sciences
Fluid dynamicists
Academic staff of the University of Copenhagen
Rectors of the University of Copenhagen
Members of the German Academy of Sciences at Berlin

Commanders First Class of the Order of the Dannebrog
People from Nordfyn Municipality